Naches Valley High School is a public high school located in Naches, Washington. It serves 350 students in grades 9–12. 80% of the students are White, while 16% are Hispanic, 2% are two or more races, 1% are American Indian, 1% are Black and 1% are Asian.

The Naches mascot is the Ranger Bear . The busing areas stretch from the areas of Gleed and the Naches Heights, to the tops of both White and Chinook Pass.

Post Graduation 
Students at Naches range in their post-graduation plans. Several graduates join the workforce, others join the military, some attend technical colleges.  The majority of graduates ultimately attend 2 or 4-year university programs upon graduation.

References

External links
School web site (as of October 2021)

Public high schools in Washington (state)
High schools in Yakima County, Washington